Aloe abyssicola is a species of aloe plant found in Yemen, known only from the type locality, in cliff faces in Jabal Al-Arays.

References

Plants described in 1971
Flora of Yemen
abyssicola